Ponraman Perumal, known professionally as Ponram is an Indian film director and screenwriter. He directed the film  Thirutham in 2007 Varuthapadatha Valibar Sangam in 2013. Later on he had directed Seema Raja in 2018.

Career 
He directed Sivakarthikeyan in the comedy film Varuthapadatha Valibar Sangam. In a review of the film, a critic stated that the film is a "jolly good fun ride". The film was a commercial success. Ponram went on to work with Sivakarthikeyan in Rajinimurugan (2016) and Seemaraja (2018). Rajinimurugan and Seemaraja received mixed reviews upon release although the former ended up as a commercial success. Ponram also directed Town Bus, starring Gautham Karthik, for the nine-episode anthology series Navarasa; the episode, despite being filmed in October 2020, was not included in the series.

Filmography 
As director

References

External links 
 

21st-century Indian film directors
Tamil film directors
Living people
Year of birth missing (living people)